National Highway 505, commonly called NH 505, is a national highway in  India. It is a spur road of National Highway 5. NH-505 traverses the state of Himachal Pradesh in India. NH505 a high elevation road, covers Kinnaur and Lahaul and Spiti districts of Himachal Pradesh, mainly running along Spiti river in Spiti valley.

Overview 
National Highway 505, was designated Himachal state highway 30 prior to its being notified on 4 March 2014 as a national highway.  The highway runs through the high elevation cold desert area of Lahaul and Spiti valleys of Himachal, which area receives negligible rainfall. The terrain is barren and treacherous, prone to landslides and disruptions. The road is narrow and rough at places and crosses the high elevation Kunzum pass, requiring good driving skills in mountains. NH-505 provides connectivity to some major Buddhist monasteries and various interesting places.

Route 

The route of NH-505 starts at the Khab Sangam in Kinnaur district from National Highway 5.  It runs along the Spiti valley through Kinnaur and enters Lahaul and Spiti district at Sumdo.  It continues up the Spiti valley to Kunzum Pass.  It descends and follows the Chandra River to the terminus at Gramphoo.

Kinnaur district 
Travelling from Chandigarh or Shimla to Khab gives a chance for travellers to gradually acclimatize themselves to avoid altitude sickness. NH-505 climbs steeply from Khab Sangam up to Nako. It descends to Chango on the Spiti River, then enters Lahaul and Spiti district at Sumdo.

Lahaul and Spiti district 

From Sumdo, NH-505 runs mostly alongside the Spiti river for about  until Losar. After passing through Hurling, the next town is Tabo with the well-known Tabo Monastery and caves. The highway passes through some unusual clay pillars en route to Kaza, the largest town in Spiti valley. Near Lingti,  before Kaza, the  road to Pin Valley National Park branches off over the Attargo Bridge to the right bank of the Spiti. On the Tabo side of Lingti is the road to the Dhanker Monastery. The river itself is much narrower and meanders in braids along the broad riverbed.

After Kaza, NH-505 crosses to the right bank of the Spiti river over the Rangrik Bridge. At the bridge, the Kaza-Kibber road continues on the left bank to Key Monastery and the Kibber Wildlife Sanctuary. The road crosses back to the left bank  before Kialto village. After Morang and Hanse villages, the valley broadens before Losar village.

After Losar, NH-505 turns up the right bank of the Lichu, a right bank tributary of the Spiti.  The road climbs gradually up to Kunzum La, elev. .  There is a temple at the pass.  

From Kunzum pass, the highway descends through steep hairpin bends to Batal village on the left bank of the Chandra river. Chandra Taal is a pristine lake on the Chandra River popular with tourists and high-altitude trekkers.

From Batal, NH-505 follows the left bank of the Chandra river, practically running on the riverbed in some places as both sides of the narrow valley are very steep.  This section is largely unpaved and impassable during the winter months.  Passing through Chotta Dara the highway reaches Chhatru where it crosses to the right bank.  It climbs steeply and runs along the top of a cliff overlooking the Chandra river until the terminus at Gramphu (Gramphoo).

Junctions  

|Kinnaur district
|Khab
|0.0
|0.0
|
|Southeast terminus
|-
|Lahaul and Spiti district
|Attargo Bridge
|74.6
|120.0
|Mud village, Pin Valley
|About  NW of Lingti
|-
|Lahaul and Spiti district
|Gramphoo
|169.6
|273.0
|
|Northwest terminus

See also 
 List of National Highways in India
 List of National Highways in India by state

References  

National highways in India
National Highways in Himachal Pradesh